The Phoenix Subdivision is a railroad line in the U.S. state of Arizona owned by the Union Pacific Railroad. The southeast end of the line connects to the Gila Subdivision near Eloy, runs northeast to Phoenix, and becomes the Roll Industrial Lead, running southwest before reconnecting to the Gila Subdivision at Wellton. ,  of the line between Roll and Arlington are out of service and used for car storage.

Usage
The railway is used by almost exclusively for freight movements, with about four trains per day . The McElhaney Cattle Company maintains trackage rights over the western  of the line, with traffic consisting of grain cars.

Amtrak ran the Sunset Limited on the route until 1996 when Union Pacific wanted to reduce upkeep costs on the west end of the line; passenger service was rerouted to Maricopa. The line is part of a system of proposed commuter rail lines in the Phoenix metropolitan area.

History
The rail line between Wellton and Phoenix was built by the Southern Pacific Railway, with passenger service commencing in 1928. The line was downgraded to a branch line in 1997, as most traffic was rerouted via Maricopa.

References

Rail infrastructure in Arizona
Union Pacific Railroad lines
Rail transportation in Phoenix, Arizona